Tsaone Macheng (born on November 24, 1989) is a Botswana beauty pageant titleholder who was crowned Miss Universe Botswana 2013, was represented Botswana at the Miss Universe 2013 pageant.

Early life
Tsaone who currently resides in Port Elizabeth, South Africa where she studies Fine Arts at Nelson Mandela Metropolitan University in South Africa.

Miss Universe Botswana 2013
Tsaone Macheng emerged as the winner of the Miss Universe Botswana title after winning a pageant held in Gaborone International Conference Center on September 7. Benah Sekgabo was declared as first runner-up while the second runner-up was Boitumelo Kanedi.
Tsaone represented Botswana at Miss Universe 2013 pageant in Moscow, Russia on November 9, 2013.

References

External links
Official Miss Universe Botswana Facebook

Living people
Botswana beauty pageant winners
People from Gaborone
Miss Universe 2013 contestants
1989 births